Stage is a live compilation of Keller Williams's 2003 tour and is divided into 2 CDs. Stage Left, features songs from the west coast shows, and Stage Right containing songs from the east coast leg of the tour. The collection includes a wide range of covers including songs by The Grateful Dead, Buffalo Springfield, David Bowie & Queen, Van Morrison, Sugar Hill Gang and Michael Jackson.

The album ranked 39th on Billboards Independent Albums listing in 2004 and was declared the Live Album of the Year''''' at the 2005 Jammy Awards.

Track listing
 Tubeular 3:28  
 Rapper's Delight 6:09  
 Skitso  Williams  3:16  
 Under Pressure 3:32  
 Skinjuku 3:01  
 Keep It Simple 4:51  
 Dance of the Freek 7:44  
 Blazeabago 2:16  
 Let's Go Dancing 2:28  
 Blazeabago 2:50  
 Moondance 10:35  
 Stargate 5:02  
 Hum Diddly Eye 3:21  
 One Way Johnny 3:28  
 Novelty Song 5:10  
 Shapes of M + M's 3:34  
 Don't Stop 'Til You Get Enough 2:08  
 Dudelywah 4:03  
 Bird Song 9:30  
 For What It's Worth 8:35  
 Prelude to a Cracker 1:37  
 Cracker Ass Cracker 3:25  
 Zilla a Trois 4:44  
 Gate Crashers Suck 3:02  
 Balcony Baby 6:19  
 Celebrate Your Youth 6:40  
 My Sisters and Brothers/Boob Job 12:10

Credits
Mark Berger - Package Design  
Jeff Covert - Mixing  
C. Taylor Crothers - Photography  
Louis Gosain - Engineer  
Charlie Pilzer - Mastering  
Keller Williams - Mixing

References

Keller Williams albums
2004 live albums